The Auctoritates Aristotelis ("Authoritative [passages of] Aristotle") was a popular florilegium (anthology of brief extracts) probably composed around the end of the thirteenth century by the Italian scholar Marsilius of Padua.

This large collection of sententiae (opinions) derived from scholastic texts was compiled around 1300 by Johannes de Fonte while he was a lector in theology at the Franciscan convent in Montpellier. He says in the prologue that his work is intended to provide assistance “as much for preaching to the people as study of the arts.” The work enjoyed a wide circulation,  providing a convenient way to access Aristotle's philosophy, or to embellish a composition or sermon with quotations from his work.

References 
 Jacqueline Hamesse, Les auctoritates Aristotelis, Louvain & Paris, 1974.

Notes

External links 
 Auctoritates Aristotelis et aliorum philosophorum

13th-century Latin books
Works about Aristotle
Books of quotations